Events in the year 1926 in Bulgaria.

Incumbents

Events 

 The first men's event of the Bulgarian Athletics Championships was held.

References 

 
1920s in Bulgaria
Years of the 20th century in Bulgaria
Bulgaria
Bulgaria